Brazil competed at the 2004 Summer Paralympics in Athens, Greece. The team included 96 athletes, 74 men and 22 women. Competitors from Brazil won 33 medals, including 14 gold, 12 silver and 7 bronze to finish 14th in the medal table.

Medallists

Sports

Athletics

Men's track

Women's track

Women's field

Equestrian

Football 5-a-side
The Brazilian football 5-a-side team won the gold medal after defeating Argentina.

Players
Marcos Felipe
Anderson Fonseca
Mizael Oliveira
Damião Ramos
Andreonni Rego
Sandro Soares
João Silva
Nilson Silva
Severino Silva
Fábio Vasconcelos

Results

Football 7-a-side
The Brazilian football 7-a-side team won a silver medal after being defeated by Ukraine.

Players
Fabiano Bruzzi
Adriano Costa
Marcos Ferreira
Joseph Guimarães
Renato Lima
Leandro Marinho
Flávio Pereira
Jean Rodrigues
Luciano Rocha
Peterson Rosa
Marcos Silva
Moisés Silva

Results

Goalball
The Brazilian women's goalball didn't win any medals. They were 7th out of 8 teams.

Players
Claúdia Amorim
Evelyne Cantanhede
Ana Carolina Custodio
Valkilene Dalarme
Renata Hermenegildo
Adriana Lino

Results

Judo

Men

Women

Powerlifting

Men

Swimming

Men

Women

Table tennis

Men

Teams

Wheelchair fencing

Wheelchair tennis

See also
Brazil at the Paralympics
Brazil at the 2004 Summer Olympics

References 

Nations at the 2004 Summer Paralympics
2004
Summer Paralympics